Calloused marks the third album from Gideon. Facedown Records released the project on October 14, 2014. Gideon worked with Will Putney on the production of this album.

Reception

Signaling in a three star review by HM Magazine, Collin Simula replies, "All in all, Calloused is a solid, enjoyable listen." Mark Deming, indicating in a three and a half star review from AllMusic, recognizes, "Gideon show off both their bone-snapping force and exacting precision on Calloused." Mentioning in an eight out of ten review at Cross Rhythms, Tony Cummings reports, "Facedown Records are still delivering the hardcore goods."

Specifying in a three star review by Jesus Freak Hideout, Wayne Reimer retorts, "Musically, Gideon could have (and have) done better, but considering the target demographic and the wholesome lyrics, all their young fans may just want another big mouthful of knobs to chew on." Brody Barbour, representing a three star review from Indie Vision Music, realizes, "Gideon have created an album packed to the rafters with energy and passion in 'Calloused'."

Track listing

Personnel 

Gideon
 Daniel McWhorter - vocals
 Daniel McCartney – lead guitar, vocals
 Tyler Riley - rhythm guitar, vocals
 Timothy Naugher – bass
 Jake Smelley – drums

Additional musicians
 Caleb Shomo - guest vocals on "Survive"

Charts

References

2014 albums
Facedown Records albums
Gideon (band) albums